Chapada do Apodi is a microregion in the Brazilian state of Rio Grande do Norte.

Municipalities 
The microregion consists of the following municipalities:
 Apodi
 Caraúbas
 Felipe Guerra
 Governador Dix-Sept Rosado

References

Microregions of Rio Grande do Norte